The Changsha Maglev Express is a medium-low speed magnetic levitation, or maglev line in Changsha, China. This is China's second maglev line, after Shanghai Maglev, and the first domestically built maglev line that uses indigenous technology. The line stretches over 18.55 kilometers and runs between Changsha Huanghua International Airport, Langli station and the high-speed railway station Changsha South railway station.

History
Construction started in May 2014, trial running on 26 December 2015, and finally start trial operations on 6 May 2016. Since the beginning of construction in May 2014, the project has received an estimated investment of 4.6 billion yuan ($749 million).

A  extension of the line is currently under construction, to connect to the under construction Terminal 3 on the east side of the airport. Two underground stations are planned for the extension. Construction started on 25 April 2021.

Opening timeline

Stations

Operating hours
The first train departs from Huanghua Airport station or Changsha South railway station at 7:00am. The last train leaves Changsha South railway station at 10:00pm or Huanghua Airport station at 10:30pm. The current service interval is 11 minutes 40 seconds and each train completes the whole journey in 19 minutes 30 seconds.

References

Rail transport in Hunan
Maglev
Railway lines opened in 2016
2016 establishments in China
Airport rail links in China
Monorails
Monorails in China